Nhamundá is the easternmost municipality in the Brazilian state of Amazonas. Its population was 21,443 (2020) and its area is 14,106 km².

References

Municipalities in Amazonas (Brazilian state)
Populated places established in 1956
1956 establishments in Brazil